Tanner Paul Tully (born November 30, 1994) is an American professional baseball pitcher in the New York Yankees organization. He has played in Major League Baseball (MLB) for the Cleveland Guardians.

Amateur career
Tully attended Elkhart Central High School in Elkhart, Indiana, and Ohio State University, where he played college baseball for the Ohio State Buckeyes. In 2015, he played collegiate summer baseball with the Orleans Firebirds of the Cape Cod Baseball League.

Professional career

Cleveland Indians / Guardians
The Cleveland Indians selected Tully in the 26th round of the 2016 Major League Baseball draft. He made his professional debut with the Low-A Mahoning Valley Scrappers, recording a 1.17 ERA in 13 appearances. In 2017, Tully played for four different Cleveland affiliates; the Single-A Lake County Captains, the High-A Lynchburg Hillcats, the Double-A Akron RubberDucks, and the Triple-A Columbus Clippers. In 25 appearances (15 of them starts) between the four clubs, Tully logged a 6–10 record and 3.69 ERA with 95 strikeouts in  innings pitched. The following year he returned to Lynchburg, going 6–11 with a 4.47 ERA and 109 strikeouts in 26 starts. In 2019, Tully split the season between Akron and Columbus, pitching to a 9–12 record and 4.44 ERA with 89 strikeouts in 144 innings pitched across 26 starts. Tully did not play in a game in 2020 due to the cancellation of the minor league season because of the COVID-19 pandemic. He spent the 2021 campaign with Akron and Columbus, working to a 6–6 record and 3.50 ERA with 97 strikeouts in 26 appearances (18 of them starts).

On April 20, 2022, Tully was selected to the 40-man roster and promoted to the major leagues for the first time as a COVID-19 replacement player. Tully made his major league debut on April 22, throwing two innings of relief against the New York Yankees, allowing 1 run on a home run by Aaron Judge. He was removed from the 40-man roster and returned to Triple-A the next day. The Guardians selected Tully's contract a second time on June 25. Tully was designated for assignment on June 27. After clearing waivers, he was outrighted to the minor leagues on June 29. The Guardians selected Tully's contract once more on July 14. Tully was designated for assignment once again on July 18. Tully cleared waivers and was outrighted to the minor leagues once more on July 20. Tully elected minor league free agency on October 13.

New York Yankees
On December 15, 2022, Tuly signed a minor league contract with the New York Yankees.

References

External links

1994 births
Living people
Akron RubberDucks players
Baseball players from Indiana
Cleveland Guardians players
Columbus Clippers players
Lake County Captains players
Lynchburg Hillcats players
Major League Baseball pitchers
Mahoning Valley Scrappers players
Ohio State Buckeyes baseball players
Orleans Firebirds players
People from Elkhart, Indiana
Scottsdale Scorpions players